Giacomo Pavia (1655–1749) was an Italian painter of the Baroque period, active mainly in his native Bologna. He studied and worked under Giuseppe Maria Crespi and Giovanni Gioseffo dal Sole. He died in Spain. His son Lorenzo Pavia painted quadratura.

References

1655 births
1740 deaths
Painters from Bologna
17th-century Italian painters
Italian male painters
18th-century Italian painters
Italian Baroque painters
18th-century Italian male artists